The elections to the next Vice-President of India,  were held on 5 August 2017. The announcement was made by the Election Commission of India.

Rajya Sabha Secretary-General Shumsher K. Sheriff served as the Returning Officer for the 15th Vice-Presidential election.

Vice-President Mohammad Hamid Ansari, completed his second term on 10 August 2017. Venkaiah Naidu won the election and took oath as 13th Vice-President of India on 11 August 2017 at Darbar Hall, Rashtrapati Bhawan, New Delhi.

Background 

The Vice President of India is the exofficio chairperson of the Rajya Sabha (upper house of the Indian parliament) and functions as its speaker. He also assumes the post of the President of India in case of a vacancy and stays in the post for a maximum period of six months and performs all the functions of the President. The Vice President also has a term of five years.

During the election, the outgoing vice president was Mohammad Hamid Ansari. He was elected to the post in 2007 and re-elected in 2012. His term ended on 10 August 2017. The Election Commission of India announced that the election would be held on 5 August and the result would be declared on the same day.

Election process 
The Vice President is elected by an electoral college which includes members of the Rajya Sabha (the upper house of Indian parliament) and the members of the Lok Sabha (lower house of the Indian parliament). The nominated members of the mentioned houses are also eligible to vote in the election process. In the election, voting will be done by a secret ballot and the members of parliament will use a "special pen" to mark their preference.

For the 2017 election, the electoral college consists of
Rajya Sabha members: 233 elected and 12 nominated
Lok Sabha members: 543 elected.

Candidates 
A candidate participating in the election needs the support of at least 20 electors who would be the proposers of the candidate and needs to get another additional support of at least 20 seconders. The candidate also has to deposit ₹15000 ($233) as a security deposit.
Two candidates were nominated for the election. One candidate was nominated by the National Democratic Alliance and another by United Progressive Alliance.

NDA Candidate 
Venkaiah Naidu was nominated by National Democratic Alliance. He was the then Minister of Information and Broadcasting and Minister of Housing and Urban Poverty Alleviation of India. He had also served as a party president of Bharatiya Janata Party. Prime Minister Narendra Modi said that Naidu was a "fitting candidate" for the post. According to Indian Express leaders of the Bharatiya Janata Party felt that if Naidu got elected then it would act as a morale booster for the party in south Indian states of Telangana and Andhra Pradesh. Besides the parties of the NDA, YSR Congress party, AIADMK and Telangana Rashtra Samiti parties also pledged to support Naidu. News18 wrote that Naidu was expected to get 489 votes compared to 394 votes required to win the election.

UPA Candidate 
Gopalkrishna Gandhi was the candidate nominated by the United Progressive Alliance and had the support of 18 opposition parties. He is the grandson of Mahatma Gandhi and C. Rajagopalachari, two prominent figures of the Indian freedom movement. A former diplomat, Gandhi is an alumnus of St. Stephen's College and has also served as India's envoy to Sri Lanka, Norway and South Africa. He has also held the post of Governor of West Bengal and presided over the state during Nandigram violence. Gandhi had the support of Indian National Congress, Janata Dal (United), Rashtriya Janata Dal, Nationalist Congress Party and the Left Front.

Results
Following the election, Venkaiah Naidu  was elected 13th Vice-President of India. He has sworn-in to the office on 11 August 2017. Of 790 seats in Parliament, 5 seats were vacant during the election.

|- align=center
!style="background-color:#E9E9E9" class="unsortable"|
!style="background-color:#E9E9E9" align=center|Candidate
!style="background-color:#E9E9E9" |Party
!style="background-color:#E9E9E9" |Electoral Votes
!style="background-color:#E9E9E9" |% of Votes
|-
| 
|align="left"|Venkaiah Naidu||align="left"|BJP||516||67.89
|-
| 
|align="left"|Gopalkrishna Gandhi||align="left"|Independent||244||32.11
|-
| colspan="5" style="background:#e9e9e9;"|
|-
! colspan="3" style="text-align:left;"| Total
! style="text-align:right;"|760
! style="text-align:right;"|100.00
|-
| colspan="5" style="background:#e9e9e9;"| 
|-
|-
|colspan="3" style="text-align:left;"|Valid Votes||760||96.82
|-
|colspan="3" style="text-align:left;"|Invalid Votes||11||1.40
|-
|colspan="3" style="text-align:left;"|Turnout||771||98.22
|-
|colspan="3" style="text-align:left;"|Abstentions||14||1.78
|-
|colspan="3" style="text-align:left;"|Electors||785|| style="background:#e9e9e9;"|
|-
|}

See also
 List of vice presidents of India
 2017 Indian presidential election

References

External links

India
August 2017 events in India
Vice-presidential elections in India